Major General Sven Gösta Möller (15 June 1887 – 23 September 1983) was a senior officer in the Swedish Coastal Artillery and a track and field athlete who competed in the 1912 Summer Olympics.

In 1912 he was eliminated in the first round of the 200 metres competition as well as of the 400 metres event.

References

External links
Profile

1887 births
1983 deaths
Swedish Coastal Artillery major generals
Swedish male sprinters
Olympic athletes of Sweden
Athletes (track and field) at the 1912 Summer Olympics
People from Karlskrona
Sportspeople from Blekinge County